The Warburg hypothesis, sometimes known as the Warburg theory of cancer, postulates that the driver of tumorigenesis is an insufficient cellular respiration caused by insult to mitochondria.  The term Warburg effect in oncology describes the observation that cancer cells, and many cells grown in vitro, exhibit glucose fermentation even when enough oxygen is present to properly respire.  In other words, instead of fully respiring in the presence of adequate oxygen, cancer cells ferment. The Warburg hypothesis was that the Warburg effect was the root cause of cancer. The current popular opinion is that cancer cells ferment glucose while keeping up the same level of respiration that was present before the process of carcinogenesis, and thus the Warburg effect would be defined as the observation that cancer cells exhibit glycolysis with lactate production and mitochondrial respiration even in the presence of oxygen.

Hypothesis 

The hypothesis was postulated by the Nobel laureate Otto Heinrich Warburg in 1924. He hypothesized that cancer, malignant growth, and tumor growth are caused by the fact that tumor cells mainly generate energy (as e.g., adenosine triphosphate / ATP) by non-oxidative breakdown of glucose (a process called glycolysis). This is in contrast to healthy cells which mainly generate energy from oxidative breakdown of pyruvate. Pyruvate is an end-product of glycolysis, and is oxidized within the mitochondria. Hence, according to Warburg, carcinogenesis stems from the lowering of mitochondrial respiration. Warburg regarded the fundamental difference between normal and cancerous cells to be the ratio of glycolysis to respiration; this observation is also known as the Warburg effect.

In the somatic mutation theory of cancer, malignant proliferation is caused by mutations and altered gene expression, in a process called malignant transformation, resulting in an uncontrolled growth of cells. The metabolic difference observed by Warburg adapts cancer cells to the hypoxic (oxygen-deficient) conditions inside solid tumors, and results largely from the same mutations in oncogenes and tumor suppressor genes that cause the other abnormal characteristics of cancer cells. Therefore, the metabolic change observed by Warburg is not so much the cause of cancer, as he claimed, but rather, it is one of the characteristic effects of cancer-causing mutations.

Warburg articulated his hypothesis in a paper entitled The Prime Cause and Prevention of Cancer which he presented in lecture at the meeting of the Nobel-Laureates on June 30, 1966 at Lindau, Lake Constance, Germany.  In this speech, Warburg presented additional  evidence supporting his theory that the elevated anaerobiosis seen in cancer cells was a consequence of damaged or insufficient respiration.  Put in his own words, "the prime cause of cancer is the replacement of the respiration of oxygen in normal body cells by a fermentation of sugar."

The body often kills damaged cells by apoptosis, a mechanism of self-destruction that involves mitochondria, but this mechanism fails in cancer cells where the mitochondria are shut down. The reactivation of mitochondria in cancer cells restarts their apoptosis program.

Continuing research and interest
A large number of researchers have dedicated and are dedicating their efforts to the study of the Warburg effect that is intimately associated with the Warburg hypothesis. In oncology, the Warburg effect is the observation that most cancer cells predominantly produce energy by a high rate of glycolysis followed by lactic acid fermentation in the cytosol, rather than by a comparatively low rate of glycolysis followed by oxidation of pyruvate in mitochondria as in most normal cells. Interestingly, researchers found that under obesity, tumor cells invert the metabolic flow by producing glucose by gluconeogenesis using lactic acid and other metabolic sources as substrates. This process in known as Warburg effect inversion.

In particular, almost 18,000 publications have been published on the matter of ATP and the Warburg effect in the period 2000 to 2015. Most of the functions of the Warburg Effect have been the object of study. Thousands of publications claim to have determined its functions or causes.

See also 
 Carcinogen
 Carcinogenesis
 2-Deoxy-D-glucose
 Pyruvic acid
 Cellular respiration
 Inverse Warburg effect

References

Further reading 
 

Cancer
Oncology
Mitochondria
Molecular biology